Luke Shuey (born 2 June 1990) is an Australian rules footballer and the captain of the West Coast Eagles in the Australian Football League (AFL).

Shuey was recruited from the Oakleigh Chargers with pick 20 in the 2008 National Draft. After a series of injuries, he made his AFL debut during the 2010 season. He was runner-up in the AFL Rising Star award in 2011. Shuey won the John Worsfold Medal as West Coast's best and fairest player in 2016, and again in 2019, and finished third in the award in 2014 and 2017. Awarded 'Player of the finals' in 2019, adding to his September reputation where a year earlier he played in the club's victory over Collingwood in the 2018 Grand Final, and was awarded the Norm Smith Medal as the best player on the ground.

Early career
Shuey was raised in Melbourne and attended Marcellin College, playing for the school football team. One of his teammates was David Zaharakis, who was also drafted into the AFL. Outside of school football, Shuey played his junior football for Bulleen-Templestowe.

In 2008, his final year of high school, he was selected for the Oakleigh Chargers in the TAC Cup. He also represented Vic Metro at the 2008 AFL Under 18 Championships, winning the team's best and fairest award. Shuey placed fourth in the beep test at the 2008 AFL Draft Camp. At the 2008 National Draft, he was selected in the second round, taken by West Coast with the 18th pick overall.

AFL career
As part of West Coast's affiliation with the West Australian Football League (WAFL), Shuey was allocated to  upon his arrival in Perth to pursue his career. However, he did not play senior football at all during the 2009 season (in either the WAFL or AFL), suffering a series of injuries which included osteitis pubis, a broken leg, and two hernias. Shuey later said his injuries were in part due to playing too much football during the previous year. After a strong pre-season, Shuey made his AFL debut in round one of the 2010 season, against the Brisbane Lions. He scored a goal with his first kick. However, after just three games at AFL level, Shuey suffered a knee injury. He was due to return midway through the season, but then contracted a virus which was eventually diagnosed as glandular fever. He eventually returned for West Coast's last three games of the season, as well as two WAFL matches for East Perth. He established himself in West Coast's midfield line-up during the 2011 season, playing in all 25 of his team's matches (one of only seven West Coast players to do so). He was nominated for the 2011 AFL Rising Star award in round two, after a 27-disposal and three-goal game against . He eventually finished runner-up to 's Dyson Heppell in the award, with Heppell polling 44 votes and Shuey 37 votes. This was the best finish by a West Coast player since Chris Judd was runner-up in 2002. Shuey also polled 12 votes in the 2011 Brownlow Medal, and including three votes in the round-18 Western Derby against  (although Dean Cox won the Ross Glendinning Medal). In the round-nine game against the Western Bulldogs he had kicked a career-high five goals and recorded 27 disposals, but was only awarded two Brownlow votes.

During the 2012 season, Shuey was suspended on two occasions – for one week after striking Fremantle's Paul Duffield in round nine, and for two weeks after striking 's Lindsay Thomas in round 15. He polled 11 votes in the 2012 Brownlow Medal, including best on ground performances against  in round three (25 disposals and five goals) and against  in round 14 (32 disposals and three goals).

After a career best season in 2016, Shuey was named in the initial All-Australian 40-man squad, though he did not make the final team. He also won the John Worsfold Medal as the club best and fairest.

In September 2017, Shuey kicked a goal after the siren against Port Adelaide to win the first elimination final at Adelaide Oval. It was the first after-the-siren goal in extra time in AFL history.

Shuey won the 2018 Norm Smith Medal for his brilliant performance against Collingwood in the AFL Grand Final, recording 34 possessions and a goal. He received eleven out of twelve possible votes from the four judges. His team, the West Coast Eagles, won the premiership.

On 6 December 2019 it was announced that Shuey would become the 11th captain of the West Coast Eagles.

Statistics
Statistics are correct to the end of Round 23 2022

|- style="background-color: #EAEAEA"
! scope="row" style="text-align:center" | 2010
|style="text-align:center;"|
| 13 || 6 || 6 || 4 || 59 || 47 || 106 || 20 || 22 || 1.0 || 0.7 || 9.8 || 7.8 || 17.7 || 3.3 || 3.7
|-
! scope="row" style="text-align:center" | 2011
|style="text-align:center;"|
| 13 || 25 || 24 || 22 || 323 || 179 || 502 || 65 || 104 || 1.0 || 0.9 || 12.9 || 7.2 || 20.1 || 2.6 || 4.2
|- style="background:#eaeaea;"
! scope="row" style="text-align:center" | 2012
|style="text-align:center;"|
| 13 || 21 || 19 || 22 || 286 || 197 || 483 || 82 || 89 || 0.9 || 1.0 || 13.6 || 9.4 || 23.0 || 3.9 || 4.2
|-
! scope="row" style="text-align:center" | 2013
|style="text-align:center;"|
| 13 || 14 || 9 || 8 || 178 || 123 || 301 || 48 || 67 || 0.6 || 0.6 || 12.7 || 8.8 || 21.5 || 3.4 || 4.8
|- style="background:#eaeaea;"
! scope="row" style="text-align:center" | 2014
|style="text-align:center;"|
| 13 || 20 || 17 || 14 || 249 || 235 || 484 || 74 || 80 || 0.9 || 0.7 || 12.5 || 11.8 || 24.2 || 3.7 || 4.0
|-
! scope="row" style="text-align:center" | 2015
|style="text-align:center;"|
| 13 || 25 || 24 || 12 || 273 || 320 || 593 || 82 || 123 || 1.0 || 0.5 || 10.9 || 12.8 || 23.7 || 3.3 || 4.9
|- style="background:#eaeaea;"
! scope="row" style="text-align:center" | 2016
|style="text-align:center;"|
| 13 || 23 || 12 || 8 || 272 || 324 || 596 || 56 || 149 || 0.5 || 0.3 || 11.8 || 14.1 || 25.9 || 2.4 || 6.5
|-
! scope="row" style="text-align:center" | 2017
|style="text-align:center;"|
| 13 || 23 || 11 || 7 || 312 || 293 || 605 || 93 || 134 || 0.5 || 0.3 || 13.6 || 12.7 || 26.3 || 4.0 || 5.8
|- style="background:#eaeaea;"
|style="text-align:center;background:#afe6ba;"|2018†
|style="text-align:center;"|
| 13 || 20 || 6 || 7 || 257 || 219 || 476 || 63 || 97 || 0.3 || 0.4 || 12.9 || 11.0 || 23.8 || 3.2 || 4.9
|-
! scope="row" style="text-align:center" | 2019
|style="text-align:center;"|
| 13 || 24 || 8 || 2 || 409 || 238 || 647 || 81 || 129 || 0.3 || 0.1 || 17.0 || 9.9 || 27.0 || 3.4 || 5.4
|-
! scope="row" style="text-align:center" | 2020
|style="text-align:center;"|
| 13 || 13 || 1 || 1 || 144 || 101 || 245 || 33 || 46 || 0.0 || 0.0 || 11.0 || 7.7 || 18.8 || 2.5 || 3.5
|- style="background:#eaeaea;"
|-
! scope="row" style="text-align:center" | 2021
|style="text-align:center;"|
| 13 || 7 || 0 || 1 || 104 || 56 || 160 || 23 || 30 || 0.0 || 0.1 || 14.8 || 8.0 || 22.8 || 3.2 || 4.2
|- style="background:#eaeaea;"
|-
! scope="row" style="text-align:center" | 2022
|style="text-align:center;"|
| 13 || 17 || 3 || 2 || 207 || 157 || 364 || 48 || 100 || 0.1 || 0.1 || 12.1 || 9.2 || 21.4 || 2.8 || 5.8
|- style="background:#eaeaea;"
|- class="sortbottom"
! colspan=3| Career
! 238 !! 140 !! 110 !! 3073 !! 2489 !! 5562 !! 768 !! 1170 !! 0.5 !! 0.4 !! 12.9 !! 10.4 !! 23.3 !! 3.2 !! 4.9
|}

Honours and achievements 
AFL

 1x AFL Premiership Player: 2018
 1x Norm Smith Medallist: 2018
 2x All-Australian 40-man Squad: 2016, 2019
 AFL Rising Star runner-up: 2011

West Coast Eagles

 Captain: 2020–
 2x John Worsfold Medallist: 2016, 2019
 1x Chris Mainwaring Medallist: 2016
 Rookie of the year: 2011

Personal life
In February 2009, Shuey's younger sister Melanie was struck and killed by a motorcycle while walking. He was given indefinite leave from football after her death, and stayed in Melbourne for six weeks before returning to Perth.

Shuey and his wife Dani Orlando have two children.

See also
 List of AFL debuts in 2010
 List of West Coast Eagles players

References

External links

1990 births
Living people
East Perth Football Club players
Oakleigh Chargers players
West Coast Eagles players
West Coast Eagles Premiership players
Australian rules footballers from Melbourne
John Worsfold Medal winners
Australia international rules football team players
People educated at Marcellin College, Bulleen
Norm Smith Medal winners
West Coast Eagles (WAFL) players
One-time VFL/AFL Premiership players